John Martin Grillo (born 29 November 1942, in Watford, Hertfordshire) is an English actor.

Biography
Grillo was educated at Watford Grammar School for Boys and Trinity Hall, Cambridge, and while there was actively involved in student theatre. He performed with Footlights in their annual revue. After Cambridge, he was awarded an Arts Council Playwrighting Bursary and his plays were performed at Nottingham, Glasgow, Oxford and Dublin as well as at the ADC Theatre in Cambridge.

He played Mr. Samgrass in the ITV series Brideshead Revisited, and Phillip Marriott QC in Crown Court. He had minor parts in other shows, including Blackadder II ("Bells"), Bergerac, Capital City, EastEnders, Blott on the Landscape, Maisie Raine, Mike and Angelo, Bramwell, The Bill, Prince Regent, Cracker, The Darling Buds of May, Foyle's War, The Grand, Taggart, The Broker's Man, Oliver Twist, Mother Love and Rumpole of the Bailey. Grillo performed Oswald in the BBC Television Shakespeare production of King Lear in 1982. He also had a more regular role in Three Up, Two Down, playing the gloomy and pessimistic zoo-keeper Wilf Perkins.

In 1997 he appeared as Mr Carkdale, the English teacher who spoke only in Anglo-Saxon, in two series of Steven Moffat's school-sitcom Chalk. In 2008, he contributed to the audio commentary for the DVD release.

His film credits include appearances in Scum, A Murder of Quality (film), Firefox, Brazil, Blame It on the Bellboy, Danny the Champion of the World, Christopher Columbus: The Discovery, Orlando, Jack and Sarah, FairyTale: A True Story, Jinnah, The Affair of the Necklace, and Max''.

References

External links

1942 births
English male stage actors
English male television actors
Living people
People from Watford
People educated at Watford Grammar School for Boys
Male actors from Hertfordshire